Alresford railway station may refer to:
Alresford railway station (Essex), England
Alresford railway station (Hampshire), England - a preserved railway station on the Mid-Hants Railway